David Weightman  may refer to:

 David Weightman (footballer), English professional footballer
 David Weightman (rower) (born 1971), Australian rower